Tony Lamar Carter Jr. (born May 24, 1986) is an American football coach and former cornerback. He played college football at Florida State, and signed with the Denver Broncos as an undrafted free agent in 2009. He was also a member of the New England Patriots, Minnesota Vikings, Indianapolis Colts and New Orleans Saints. He is the current Defensive Coordinator of the Orlando Guardians

Early years
Carter attended Mandarin High School in Jacksonville, FL, where he played football as a cornerback, quarterback, and wide receiver along with Running Back Johnny Hunt. As a senior, he had four interceptions, two blocked kicks, and five touchdowns and earned third-team all-state honors. He was rated the second best cornerback in the nation by Rivals.com. Carter was a member of the East Squad in the 2004 U.S. Army All-American Bowl. He also participated in track and field, reaching the state finals in the 110-meter hurdles as a junior.

College career
Following high school, Carter chose to attend Florida State University over Tennessee and North Carolina. After redshirting in 2004, Carter started all 13 games at cornerback as a freshman in 2005. His 12 pass break-ups ranked first on the team, and added 41 tackles, including four for a loss, as well as one interception. He earned first-team Freshman All-American honors as well as being named to the All-Atlantic Coast Conference second team.

After missing the first two games of his 2006 sophomore season with a knee injury, Carter went on to start the final 11 games of the season. He ranked second on the team with two interceptions, both of which Carter returned for touchdowns. Carter also added a blocked field goal return for a touchdown and a blocked PAT return for two points. His 20 points scored ranked seventh on the team. He finished the season with 27 tackles and was named the Most Valuable Defensive Player of the team's Emerald Bowl victory.

As a junior in 2007, Carter started all 13 games at cornerback, finishing with 45 tackles on the season, his career high. He also set a career mark with four interceptions, while tying the team lead with six pass break-ups and was First-Team All ACC. In 2008, as a senior, Carter again started all 13 games, ending his Florida State career with a 33-game starting streak. He finished the season with 25 tackles and two interceptions and earned first-team All-ACC honors.

Professional career

Denver Broncos
After going undrafted in the 2009 NFL Draft, Carter signed with the Denver Broncos on April 27, 2009. He was waived during final cuts on September 5, 2009, and re-signed to the team's practice squad the next day. He was promoted to the Broncos' active roster on December 19, 2009, and made his NFL debut in Week 15 against the Oakland Raiders. In Week 16 against the Philadelphia Eagles, Carter made his first career start. He finished the 2009 season with three tackles and one pass defensed. He spent the first three games of the 2010 preseason with the Broncos before being waived/injured on August 30, 2010 with a hamstring injury. He cleared waivers the next day, August 31, and was released with an injury settlement; he otherwise would have reverted to injured reserve.

New England Patriots
The New England Patriots signed Carter to their practice squad on September 7, 2010. He was promoted to the 53-man roster on December 18, 2010, prior the Patriots' Week 15 game against the Green Bay Packers. He was active for two of the final three games of the season, recording one tackle. On July 26, Carter was informed he would be released on July 28.

Minnesota Vikings
On August 11, 2011, Carter signed with the Minnesota Vikings.

Second stint with the Broncos

2012 season
On November 29, 2011, Carter once again signed with the Denver Broncos. On October 15, 2012, against the San Diego Chargers on Monday Night Football, he recovered a fumble and ran 65 yards to score his first career touchdown. He would then intercept Philip Rivers in the 4th quarter.  Carter had an interception return for a touchdown in a win November 10, 2012 over the Carolina Panthers.

2013 season
On September 15, 2013 against the New York Giants on the first play of the fourth quarter, Carter deflected a pass with his foot, which made the ball go right into the hands of teammate Chris Harris Jr. On November 24, against his former team the New England Patriots, Carter made a mistake that cost Denver the game. New England was punting in overtime with a 31-31 score. Punt returner Wes Welker, also a former Patriot, made a "get out of the way" signal. The call was late and did not give Carter time to move away, the football hit Carter's thigh which made it a free football and Nate Ebner recovered it in Broncos territory, which set up the game-winning 31-yard field goal by Stephen Gostkowski.

Indianapolis Colts
On October 20, 2015, Carter signed with the Indianapolis Colts. He appeared in 3 games before being waived on November 9.

New Orleans Saints 
On December 16, 2015, Carter was signed by the New Orleans Saints. On December 26, 2015, he was waived. On February 8, 2016, he was signed by the Saints. On July 29, 2016, he was waived.

Coaching career
Carter was hired by the Detroit Lions as a defensive assistant in 2020. He was the interim defensive backs coach for the team's week 16 game in 2020 against the Tampa Bay Buccaneers due to Steve Gregory missing the game under COVID-19 protocols.

Carter was hired to be the Defensive Coordinator of the Orlando Guardians in June 2022, under his former coach at Florida State Terrell Buckley

References

External links
 Denver Broncos bio

1986 births
American football cornerbacks
Denver Broncos players
Florida State Seminoles football players
Indianapolis Colts players
Living people
Minnesota Vikings players
New England Patriots players
New Orleans Saints players
Players of American football from Jacksonville, Florida
Mandarin High School alumni
Detroit Lions coaches